Polyporus brumalis is an inedible species of fungus in the genus Polyporus.

References

External links
 
 

brumalis
Polyporaceae
Fungi described in 1818
Inedible fungi